Tom Taylor, known by the gamertag Tsquared, is a former professional gamer and captain of one of the most successful teams in Major League Gaming (MLG) history, Str8 Rippin, and was also the coach of Status Quo during the 2010 National Championships in Dallas where he helped them place 2nd behind Final Boss. Making him one of the only players to also coach an event. He was signed to a 250,000 contract by MLG and earned between $120,000 and $150,000 each year in prize money and endorsement deals. He has founded his own company, Gaming Lessons, which tutors prospective professional gamers on various video games, specifically on the Halo series. Several other professional gamers from MLG are also employed by Gaming Lessons as instructors. He also runs an active YouTube channel with over 10,000 subscribers and 24 hours' worth of content.

Tsquared has been featured on MTV's documentary series True Life: I'm a Professional Gamer and on Icons, as well as in The Wall Street Journal, among other publications. He also appeared as part of Stuff magazine's list of 20 most influential people under the age of 30 in August 2006. He also makes occasional appearances on X-Play, giving out tips for various online games.

In 20082009, Tsquared appeared on over 175 million Dr Pepper bottles issued across the United States as part of a promotional sponsorship for MLG. He is currently working as a GameSpot ambassador.

Tsquared returned to competitive Halo by heading revived Str8 Rippin in Season 1 of the Halo Championship Series in November 2015. On April 3, 2015, Tsquared announced his retirement from competitive Halo during his livestream on Twitch.

Tournament placements
 MLG New York Championships 2004 – 4th
 MLG New York Championships 2005 – 5 – 6th
 MLG Las Vegas Championships 2006 – 3rd
 MLG Las Vegas Championships 2007 – 3rd
 MLG Las Vegas Championships 2008 – 1st
 MLG Orlando Championships 2009 – 6th
 MLG Providence Championships 2011 – 20th
 MLG Winter Championship 2012 – 13-16th
 ESL MCC Launch Invitational	2nd	
 2015 Halo Championship Series Season 1 – 5th

Personal life
Taylor was born and raised in Syracuse, New York then moved to Florida in 2001 to attend high school. In 2009 he and Str8 Rippin moved to a gaming house in Orlando, Florida.

In 2011 Tsquared appeared on the YouTube reality television series The Controller: Battlefield 3.

References

External links
 
 tsquared on Twitch

1987 births
American esports players
Living people
People from Baldwinsville, New York
Sportspeople from Syracuse, New York
People from Orlando, Florida
People from Jupiter, Florida
Halo (franchise) players
Str8 Rippin players